This is a list of notable television shows based on subjects of Indian history. Some shows listed below are fictionalised or dramatised shows based on historical events and people.

Television shows
 
History